Gouri Sankar Dutta was an Indian Politician from the state of West Bengal. He was a member of the West Bengal Legislative Assembly. He represented the Tehatta assembly constituency as a member of the All India Trinamool Congress. In March 2021, he along with Bachchu Hansda joined Bharatiya Janata Party after being denied ticket for 2021 West Bengal Legislative Assembly election. He died of COVID-19 at age 70 on 28 April 2021.

Education
Dutta passed B.Com. in 1970 from Calcutta University. He has also undergone studies under Institute of Chartered Accountants of India but did not appear at the examination.

References 

West Bengal MLAs 2016–2021
Trinamool Congress politicians from West Bengal
Year of birth missing
Bharatiya Janata Party politicians from West Bengal
Deaths from the COVID-19 pandemic in India
2021 deaths
University of Calcutta alumni
People from Nadia district